Von Hannover v Germany [2004]  (Application no. 59320/00) was a case decided by the European Court of Human Rights in 2004. The Court ruled that German law breached Article 8 of the European Convention on Human Rights.

Connected cases are von Hannover v. Germany No. 2 (application no. 40660/08), adjudicated in February, 2012, and von Hannover v. Germany No. 3 (application no. 8772/10), adjudicated in September 2013.

Facts
Caroline, Princess of Hanover, the eldest daughter of Prince Rainier III of Monaco had for some time attempted to prevent pictures being published of her in the German press. In 1999 the German courts granted an injunction to prevent publication of photos involving her children stating that their need for protection was greater than that of adults. However the German Constitutional Court ruled that there was no breach of privacy as Caroline, Princess of Hanover was a public figure, specifically a "figure of contemporary society par excellence".

Judgment
On 24 June 2004, the Court unanimously ruled that there was a breach of Article 8 of the European Convention on Human Rights. It accepted that scenes from daily life, involving activities such as engaging in sport, out walking, leaving a restaurant or on holiday were of a purely private nature, but also noted that "photos appearing in the tabloid press are often taken in a climate of continual harassment which induces in the person concerned a very strong sense of intrusion into their private life or even of persecution" and that "the context in which these photos were taken – without the applicant’s knowledge or consent – and the harassment endured by many public figures in their daily lives cannot be fully disregarded".

Judges Cabral Barreto and Zupančič filed concurring opinions, but based on different reasons.

See also
Privacy in English law

Notes

External links 
 official text (HUDOC)
 (British and Irish Legal Information Institute)

Article 8 of the European Convention on Human Rights
European Court of Human Rights cases involving Germany